Bill McSweeney is a senior research fellow in international peace studies at the Trinity College Dublin, Ireland. Within academia he is considered the leading critic of the Copenhagen School of security studies.

Select publications
McSweeney, B. (1999) Security, Identity and Interests: A Sociology of International Relations, Cambridge: Cambridge University Press

References

External links
Academic bio

Copenhagen School (security studies)
Academics of University College Dublin
Living people
Year of birth missing (living people)